Book Girl is a collection of Japanese light novels written by Mizuki Nomura, with illustrations by Miho Takeoka. The novels share the common title , which is where the series gets its name. The series centers around Konoha Inoue, a writer in high school who joined the literature club after meeting Tohko Amano, the president and sole member of the club. Tohko can only eat stories by consuming the paper they are printed on and Tohko often asks Konoha to write her short stories as "snacks".

There are 16 novels in the series: eight cover the original series, four are short story collections, and four are of a side story. The eight novels of the original series were published between April 28, 2006 and August 30, 2008. The four short story collections were published between December 26, 2008 and December 25, 2010; many of the short stories were previously published in Enterbrain's FB Online online magazine. The four side story novels were published between April 30, 2009 and April 30, 2011. The first three side story novels are a part of a single story, while the last one is separate. The novels were published by Enterbrain under their Famitsu Bunko imprint. Yen Press licensed the light novel series and began releasing it in English in North America in July 2010, with a new volume being released every six months.

Volume list

Main series

Short story collections

Side story series

Additional stories

References

External links
Book Girl light novels at Yen Press

Book Girl